Dhi Khair is a sub-district located in the Al Malagim District, Al Bayda Governorate, Yemen. Dhi Khair had a population of 4183 according to the 2004 census.

References 

Sub-districts in Al Malagim District